Starygino is a rural locality (a village) in Oktyabrskoye Rural Settlement, Vyaznikovsky District, Vladimir Oblast, Russia. The population was 49 as of 2010.

Geography 
Starygino is located 18 km southwest of Vyazniki (the district's administrative centre) by road. Naguyevo is the nearest rural locality.

References 

Rural localities in Vyaznikovsky District